is a mecha anime television series produced by Sunrise. It was directed by Ryousuke Takahashi, who also co-created the series along with Sunrise (Hajime Yatate). Goro Taniguchi was the assistant director. The screenplay was written by Toru Nozaki.

The series centers on Yushiro Gowa who pilots a bipedal weapons system known as a TA, short for Tactical Armor. Much of the initial plot is driven by means of news reports.

Set in the near-future, the series is formed around political narratives that concern a fictional war between the US and the fictional Middle Eastern country of Belgistan. An influential Japanese family, the Gowa, produce a bipedal weapon, the TA. When US military forces attempt to seize the capital they are systematically wiped out by what appear to be rival TAs. The Gowa Family seizes this opportunity to demonstrate their weapon system, and civilian pilot Yuushiro Gowa and the military squad to which he is attached are deployed to Belgistan. There, he meets rival TA pilot Miharu, with whom he seems to share a deep spiritual bond.

The series has a mix of futuristic and historical narratives and includes elements of Japanese culture, such as Noh and Shinto, rigid family hierarchies, corruption of government by zaibatsu, and samurai appear throughout the series.

Plot
In ancient Japan, the Gowa family created a demonic Armor in order to defeat their enemies. Hundreds of years later in the 2010s, this armor is exploited by the Gowa in the development of Tactical Armor for military usage and the usurpation of Japan.

Characters
  The main character of Gasaraki is a quiet, withdrawn teenage boy who is viewed as a tool through which his elder brothers in the Gowa family seek to further their goals. He is a member of a special JSDF unit charged with testing the TA system. As a test pilot, he is found to possess the ability to synchronize to an extraordinary degree with the TA hardware, and in particular with the Mile One synthetic muscle tissue (a process described as a "Mental Burst"). At the behest of his family, he is also a performer of a fictional, mystical form of Noh theatre, the dance of Gasara, through which he is able to open dimensional gateways. 
  Much like Yuushiro, Miharu is a quiet, introverted girl, who is a test subject for the organization known as Symbol. She pilots the organization's version of the TA, referred to as Fake. She's well aware of her role but does not seem to mind very much until she meets Yuushiro, who awakens in her the desire for self-determination. 
  The eldest of the Gowa brothers, he's very ambitious and cleverly plots his rise to power first in the family by replacing his father as master of the house and then in the world by weaving a complex political and economic web. He's obsessed with obtaining the power of the mysterious Gasaraki, which he believes will give him the ultimate supremacy, and will stop at nothing to acquire it. 
  The second son of Daizaburo Gowa, he's a man of science and an accomplished researcher. He's the genius behind the development of the TAs that he considers his lifework. To further his studies, he's ready to follow Kazukiyo's sinister plans, disregarding any danger that might befall his relatives or co-workers. 
  The third son of Daizaburo Gowa, he's an expert analyst and mediator, qualities that make him a successful businessman. He agrees to support Kazukiyo even though he does not approve of some of his means. 
  She's the youngest in the family and has a close relationship only with her father and older brother Yuushiro since they're only a few years apart. She knows something is not right in the family and tries to break through her sheltered upbringing to learn the truth about her beloved brother and ultimately herself. 
  A council member of Symbol he appears to be one of the top figures, taking orders directly from the President. He shows great interest in Miharu's development and well-being, coming to view her as a cherished person and not just a means to an end. 
  Symbol's CEO

Media

Anime
Gasaraki consists of 25 television episodes which were first aired on TV Tokyo and the rest of the TX Network from October 4, 1998, to March 28, 1999. It was released on VHS and DVD in North America and the UK by ADV Films. Nozomi Entertainment has re-licensed the series and was re-released in 2012.

Manga

Video game
On January 13, 2000, the video game, Tactical Armor Custom Gasaraki, was released for the PlayStation.

Episode list

Reception
Critical reception of Gasaraki has been generally positive. Issac Cynova of THEM Anime Reviews gave the series a rating of 3 out of 5 stars, handing out praise to the visuals, soundtrack, backgrounds, characters, the storyline, and mecha battles, but criticized the pacing of the series, stating that "much more like the Patlabor movies, it prefers to let action take a back seat to plot, and though this in itself is not a bad thing as far as I'm concerned, it does present a problem when combined with this one, singular, devastating fault: Its plot it stretched way too thin between twenty-six episodes." Cynova concludes that the series does get better near the end, and that "it's beautiful, and fairly well thought out, if not well executed."

Theron Martin of Anime News Network gave the series a B rating, praising the story, animation, and soundtrack, but criticized the series' main protagonist, the final episode of the series, and the overemphasis on Japanese nationalism, stating that "this is a very negative look at both Asian immigrants and the United States which, in the latter case, may not set well with some American viewers." Martin concludes that "this one is highly worth checking out if mecha content that emphasizes realism and technical detail more than cool factor sounds like your kind of thing."

Benjamin Wright of Animerica gave the series a positive review, stating that "Its story is deep, involving, and well thought out. Its characters are distinct and complex, with appeal for mature viewers as well as for the younger "nobody understands me" crowd. Its mecha, a masterful mix of lowbrow and high-tech, are imaginative and satisfying." However, he does note that the series starts off slow and that its first episode is unlikely to grab a lot of viewers.

Notes

References

External links

Animerica review
ANN collection review

1998 anime television series debuts
ADV Films
Anime with original screenplays
Bandai Namco franchises
Drama anime and manga
Japanese science fiction television series
Military science fiction
Real robot anime and manga
Seinen manga
Sunrise (company)
Supernatural anime and manga
Japan in fiction
Japan Self-Defense Forces in fiction